This list of memorials to Hannah Arendt includes the many objects or places named after or bearing memorial plaques to the life of the German-American Jewish political philosopher, Hannah Arendt (1906–1975).
Many of the houses in which Hannah Arendt lived, bear commemorative plaques (Gedenktafeln), such as in Heidelberg, Marburg and Berlin. In 2017, Babelsberg announced it would erect a plaque on her home there. Her birth town of Linden, Hannover celebrates her name in a variety of ways, including a plaque. The city library has a Hannah Arendt Room, exhibiting her personal possessions. Her house bears a plaque, two schools and a road (Hannah-Arendt-Weg) near the town hall are named after her, as is the square in front of the state parliament (Hannah-Arendt-Platz). There is a Hannah Arendt Fellowship and a Hannah Arendt Chair at the Helene-Lange-Schule, while Hannover celebrates Hannah Arendt Days (Hannah Arendt Tagen). Her birthplace also has a mural on a wall in the courtyard, bearing the inscription Niemand hat das Recht zu gehorchen (No one has the right to obey), a saying often attributed to her as summarizing her verdict on Adolf Eichmann. Her contributions to resistance and rescue are commemorated at the Gedenkstätte Deutscher Widerstand (German Resistance Memorial Center) in Berlin.

Hannah Arendt has been honoured by the use of her name in many contexts, including:
 The asteroid 100027 Hannaharendt (1990).
 The Hannah Arendt Intercity Express train between Karlsruhe and her birthplace, Hanover.
 Several streets, areas and parks are named after Arendt in Germany and Austria, including Hannah-Arendt Straße in Berlin-Mitte, which runs beside the Holocaust memorial, Berlin near the Brandenburg Gate and the former Reich Chancellery, Hannah-Arendt Straße in Marburg[./List_of_memorials_to_Hannah_Arendt#cite_note-FOOTNOTEMeinestadt2018-7 [7]] and Hannah-Arendt-Park, in Vienna. In France there is a Place Hannah-Arendt (Paris) and many streets named Rue Hannah Arendt, including in Strasbourg and Tours.
 In addition to Hanover, a number of schools in Germany have been named after Hannah Arendt, including those at Haßloch, Barsinghausen, Lengerich (Westphalia) and Berlin.
 In 1988, the Deutsche Post issued a 170 Pf stamp (see image), as part of its Frauen der deutschen Geschichte series, and another was issued in 2006 to celebrate the centennial of her birth.
 In 2014, Google Doodle celebrated the 108th anniversary of her birth.
 In 2014, the French philosopher  devoted a series of lectures, broadcast on the national French radio station France Culture, to an analysis of the work of Arendt.
 In 2017, the former Casa del Fascio in Bolzano, adorned with a monumental fascist bas-relief, has been recontextualized with a superimposed inscription quoting Hannah Arendt.
 In 2018, a plaque on the corner of the street where she lived in Lisbon, to mark Human Rights Day (see image)

References

Bibliography 

 
 
 
 

 

 
 , reprinted in

External images 

 
 
 

 

 

Hannah Arendt